St. Mary's High School is a high school in Jorhat, Assam, India.

Facilities
The school has 35 teachers and is affiliated to Board of Secondary Education, Assam. It has well equipped smart classes from class LKG to 12 with facilities of computer classes from 1 to 10.

Optional subjects are Hindi and Assamese from 9 to 10 and elective as Advanced Maths, Advanced Geography, Computer Science. It also provides laboratories for science practicals.

Annual sports
Annual sports start in January, held over five days. All the students are divided in 4 Groups namely - 
Blue
Green
Red
Yellow

School buildings and playgrounds
 Primary school has one play ground
 High school has one play ground.

Historical Sketch
St. Mary's High School Rowriah, Jorhat is managed by the Congregation of the Missionary Sisters of Mary help of Christians (MSMSHC) Which was founded by Late Arch Bishop Mgr. Stephen Ferrando, SDB on 24 October 1942 at Guwahati, Assam. He was the  Bishop of Shillong when the World War II broke out. Seeing the miserable conditions of the People, he sensed the need of founding a local Congregation of Women who would dedicate themselves to the service of the people.

References 

Education in Jorhat district
High schools and secondary schools in Assam
Christian schools in Assam
Educational institutions in India with year of establishment missing